Morestead is a village in the South Downs, about  southeast of Winchester in Hampshire, England. According to the Post Office the 2011 Census was included in the civil parish of Twyford.   The village is part of the civil parish of Owslebury and Morestead.

The village lies on rising downland adjacent to the ancient Roman road from Portchester to Winchester.

Morestead is predominantly a farming community and there are racehorse training stables.

The ancient Parish Church has no known dedication.

Further reading

External links

Owslebury & Morestead Parish

City of Winchester
Villages in Hampshire